The National Tile Contractors Association (NTCA) is a nonprofit trade association dedicated to the professional installation of ceramic tile and natural stone, established in 1947. The NTCA aims to improve the industry through education and training, participation in the development of standards and methods. The current president of the association is Martin Howard .

In February 2016 Bart Bettiga, executive director of the NTCA, officially announced that the association has joined forces with the Contractors Association of America (CCA) Global Partners to bring education and technical expertise to its members.

NTCA University 
The NTCA University is an online training and learning system developed to create awareness of industry standards, improve product knowledge, and train tile installers. Programs available and in development include contractor apprenticeship, and continuing education (CEU's) that unite sales and product training and business education.

Certified Tile Installer Evaluation 
The Certified Tile Installer Evaluation is a certification program introduced by the NTCA in alliance with the Ceramic Tile Education Foundation (CTEF) and the Tile Council of North America (TCNA). The program was developed in response to the lack of a mechanism for consumers to know the level of proficiency of prospective installers. The evaluation itself is a validation of the skills and knowledge of tile installers which includes a multiple-choice exam and a hands-on test. Both are based on current industry standards and best practices for producing professional installations that exhibit good workmanship. Since its inception in 2008 and until 2014, the CTI Evaluation has certified over 1000 tile installers, aiming to reach 1500 by the end of 2014.

Board of directors
The NTCA Board of Directors is elected by members at their annual meeting. It is composed of the Executive Officers of the Association, representatives of 12 regions, and members from distribution and tile and installation material manufacturers. Terms for the Board of Directors are for two years.

Committees

References

External links
Official Website
Bespoke Tiles

Tiling
Construction organizations
Organizations established in 1947
Trade associations based in the United States